This is a list of television programmes which are either currently being broadcast or have previously been broadcast by Pakistan's national television service, the Pakistan Television Corporation (PTV).

Current Programming

Fiction

Acquired Programming
Sultan Abdul Hamid
Mor Moharan

Original programming
Dushman
Us Ne Chaha Tha Chand
Rasm-e-Ulfat
Sehan

Comedy
Khatta Meetha
Ghar Daamaad
Ajju Aur Bhola

Life Style
Zaiqay Ka Dastarkhawan

Infotainment
Har Dil Bole Pakistan

Morning Shows
Rising Pakistan
Morning At Home

Former Programming

Anthologies
 Aangan Terha
 Jag Beeti

Comedy
 Alif Noon
 Aankh Macholi
 Comedy Theatre
 Choti si Duniya
 Double Sawari
 Dillagi
 Family Front
 Fifty Fifty
 Googly Mohalla
 Guest House
 Hum Se Barh Kar Kon
 Hera Pheri and Company
 Home Sweet Home
 Janjal Pura
 Jutt & Bond
 Lahori Gate
 Rent A Bhoot
 Such Much
 Sussar in Law
 Teen Bata Teen
 Video Junction

Children Programming
 Mani and Company
 Mobile Jin
 Sim Sim Hamara

DramasAahat Aanch AansooAao Kahani Buntay Hain 
 Aap Janab Aashiyana Ab Mera Intazar Kar Achanak Adam Ke Betay Afshan Aghosh Aik Bata Teen Aik Din Aja'ib Khana Ajnabi Hamsaya Ajnabi Raste Ajnabi Manzilein Akaasbel Akkar Bakkar Amber Maria Al-Arabi Sehlun Al-Lisan-ul-Arabi Alao Alpha Bravo Charlie Amarbel Amawas Ana Andhera Ujala Angar Wadi Ankahi Anokha Ladla 
 Apna Muqam Paida Kar Armaan Aroosa AshiyanaAur Zindagi Badalti Hai Bahaar Aai Bandhan Barish Ke Baad Barson Baad Barzakh Beti BezabanBhool Bint e Adam Boota from Toba Tek Singh Bulandi Chaand Bibi Chaandni Raatain ChaatChand Grehan Char Mausum Chotay Chori Chori Choti Si Duniya Chingariyaan Chubhan Chunri College Cousins Dastak Dastak Aur Darwaza Daastan Go Dabay PaonDareechayDhund Kay ParDaag-e-Nidamat Darwaza Dasht Deadline Deewar Dehleez Des Pardes Dhoop Kinare Dhoop Mein Sawan Dhuwan Dil Awaiz Dil Lagi Dil Se Dil Tak Din Din Dhallay Dosra Asman Doordesh Dosri Dastak Drya Dubai Chalo Dhoop Mein Andhera Eendhan Edimt o Mapt Esar Emergency Ward Ektala Dotala FaasleFamily 93 Feroza Filmaria UnlimitedFishaarGard Ghar Ghar Aik Nagar Ghar Ghaliyan Aur Raastey Ghulam Gardish Gul Bashra Gulls & Guys Gharoor Hai Jaidi Half Plate Halfset Haqeeqat Hawa Ki Beti Hawa Rait Aur Angan Hawain Hissar Humsafar Husratein Imtehaan Inkar Irtiqa Inspector Khojee Israr-e-Jahan Jinnah Ke Naam JangloosJashn-e-TamseelJhok Siyal JungleJunoon Jeena Dushwaar Sahi Khalida Ki Walida Kalash Kaliyan Kamand Kajal Ghar KathputliKami Reh Gaee Kanch Ke ParKanch Kay Pul Kangan KashkolKohar Kasoti Khabarnama Khalash Kharidar Khat Khayal Khala Khairan Khuda Ki Basti Khuda Zameen Se Gaya Nahin Khufia Jazeera Khul ja sim sim Khwaish Khwab Tabeer Khawaja and Son Kiran Kahani Kisay Awaz DoonKis Se Kahoon Kitnay Door Kitnay Paas Kollege Jeans Kuch is Tarah Kahin Tum Kahin Hum Laag Lagan Lakhon Main Teen Landa Bazar Lahore Junction Lyari Express Mein Aisa Kyun Hoon Mamoo Madar Maizban Pakistan Mandi Manoos Ajnabi Marvi Masoori Matti Mehman i Khasoosi Mehndi Mera Naam Mangoo Miratul Uroos Mirror Mirror Mirza Ghalib Bandar Road Par Mishaal Moin Akhter Show Musafat Musafir Rah-e-Wafa Ke Muskaan Mein Aurat Hoon Mohiu Deen Ki Chalakian Nazar Nadan Nadia Nai AwazenNeelay HathNigah Nijaat Nishan-e-Haider Nay Janay Kyun Omni Bus Palay Shah ParchiParchaiyanParosi Pooray Chand Ki RAAT Pyar mein Phool Phool Aur Kantey Qasmi Kahani Qurat-ul-Ain Rah e ishqRani Raani Raat Raat, Rail Aur Khat Raat, Rait, Hawa Ragon mein Andhera Rahain Raiza Raiza Raju Reth Riffi ki Duniya RobotRoger RoomiRoshni Ka Safar Rozi Saat Rang Saat Suron ki duniya Saaz Aur Aawaz Sach Much Saiban Sheeshay KaSamjhauta Express Samundar Shab DaigShakhsaar Shahbaz Shahpar ShamaShantul SharbatiShehzori Shella BaghSehra Teri Pyas Show Time Silsila Sitara aur Mehrunissa Soghaat Sona Chandi Space 2000 Songsoptok Sooraj Ke Sath Sath Studio Dhai Stop Watch Sunehray Din Sunday Ke Sunday Sangchoor Soniya ki gudiya Sussar In Law Two In One Tinkay Tera Pyar Nahi Bhoolay Taqdeer Tabeer Taakra Taleem-e-Balighan Tanhaiyaan Tapish Saya Ki Teesra Kinara Thora Sa Asman Thori Khushi Thora Ghum Tik Tik Company Tum Mere Kya Ho Tum Se Kehna Tha Tum Se Mil Kar The Castle: Aik Umeed Udan wala bakra Uncle Urfi University Challenge Unsuni Uraan Un Biyan Able Waadi Waqt Waris Werdi Wilco Wisaal Ya-Naseeb Clinic Yaadein Yaad Teri Anay Lagi Zaanjeer Zaib-un-Nisa Zair, Zabar, PeshZard Dopehar Zangar Zaroorat Zawia Zeenat ZiniaFantasy
 Ainak Wala Jin Ainak Wala Jin 2Telefilms/Long PlayAmarbelDhundle RasteLaldlaHistoricalAkhri ChattanBaa Adab Baa Mulahiza Hoshiyar BabarDastaan e Sassi Punnuh Labbaik ShaheenSultan Nooruddin ZangiMiniseriesMehnatSoapAbbaChahatSaheliyanReality/Unscripted60 Hours to Glory Tariq Aziz ShowTalk shows
 The Celebrity Lounge Sochta PakistanAcquired/Co-ProductionMor MahalMunkirSuno ChandaMind Your Language (Acquired British series)Diriliş: Ertuğrul (Acquired)Kuruluş: Osman'' (Acquired)

Special events 
 Cricket World Cup
 Election Transmission
 Football World Cup
 Hockey World Cup 
 Olympic Games
 PTV Silver Jubilee Special show
 PTV Awards
 UEFA European Football Championship...

See also 
 Lists of television programs
 Lists of animated television series
 Lists of comedies
 Lists of game shows
 List of science fiction television programs
 List of television spin-offs

References

External links
 PTV programme schedule

Pakistan Television Corporation
Original programming by Pakistani television network or channel